The Nine Maidens is a 1985 album by John Renbourn. The album name refers to the Nine Maidens stone row near St Columb Major in the English county of Cornwall.

Track listing
All tracks composed by John Renbourn
 "New Nothynge" – 3:50
 "The Fish in the Well" – 2:24
 "Pavan d'Aragon" – 5:38
 "Variations on My Lady Carey's Dompe" – 6:07
 "Circle Dance" – 4:18
 "The Nine Maidens"
 "Clarsach" – 5:43
 "The Nine Maidens" – 4:50
 "The Fiddler" – 2:40

References

1985 albums
John Renbourn albums